The Aravansay is a river in Kyrgyzstan and Uzbekistan. Its source is in the Kichi-Alay range, part of the Alay Range, and it discharges into the Shahrixonsoy, one of the canals of the Fergana Valley. In its upper course, it is called Gezart, in its middle course Chilisay. Its largest tributaries are the Kyrgyzata, Koschan, Agart and Akdöbö. The main settlements along the river Aravansay are the villages Jangy-Nookat and Aravan. Near the village Kara-Koktu it passes through the Dangi Canyon.

References 

Rivers of Kyrgyzstan
Rivers of Uzbekistan